Herpetogramma lulalis is a moth in the family Crambidae. It was described by Strand in 1918. It lives in Taiwan.

References

Moths described in 1918
Herpetogramma
Moths of Taiwan